¿Para qué sirve un oso? is a 2011 Spanish eco-comedy film written and directed by Tom Fernández. The film stars Javier Cámara, Gonzalo de Castro and Emma Suárez. It also stars Geraldine Chaplin and her real-life daughter, Oona. The film premiered on 26 March 2011 at the Málaga Film Festival, this was soon followed by a theatrical release in Spain on 1 April.

Plot
A biologist, Guillermo (Camara) returns to his native Spain after discovering a plant growing in the Antarctic ice. The signs are that he is ready to give up his planet-saving cause. He contacts his wildlife-photographer brother, Alejandro (Castro), who lives in a woodland hut with an enthusiastic young Californian, Vincent (Jesse Johnson), both hoping that the bears that once inhabited this area of Spain will eventually return.

Nearby to the woodland hut is Natalia (Emma Suarez), a widow and mother of Daniela (Garcia). Vincent also meets the schoolteacher, Rosa (Oona Chaplin), who he quickly falls for. Guillermo is forced to move into the woodland hut after he is kicked out of the home he shared with his foster mother, Josephine (Geraldine Chaplin). Tensions between the two brothers reach boiling point, as Alejandro's idealistic perspective is in sharp contrast with his jaded brother, Guillermo.

Cast
Javier Cámara as Guillermo
Gonzalo de Castro as Alejandro
Emma Suárez as Natalia
Geraldine Chaplin as Josephine
Jesse Johnson as Vincent
Oona Chaplin as Rosa
Sira García as Daniela

References

External links
 
Official website

2011 films
Spanish comedy films
2011 comedy films
2010s Spanish films